Mary Leona Gage (April 8, 1939 – October 5, 2010) was an American actress, model and beauty pageant titleholder who was crowned Miss USA 1957, the first from Maryland to capture the Miss USA crown. She was stripped of her title when it was revealed that she was 18, married, and the mother of two children.

Early life
She was a toddler when her parents moved from Longview, Texas to nearby Wichita Falls. Her mother worked two jobs. Her father, paralyzed in an industrial accident, stayed home. She was 13 years old when she met 24-year-old Gene Ennis, an airman in the U.S. Air Force.

When Gage became pregnant and attempted to write to Ennis after he shipped out, he never responded. A drugstore employee who was getting married suggested she should get married with a volunteer groom. Gage agreed and they headed to Oklahoma for a double wedding. She married an airman named Edward Thacker.  At her mother's insistence, the marriage to Thacker was annulled within the week.

When Ennis came back into her life in 1953, Gage, still only 14, married him in Wichita Falls; they moved to Manhattan Beach, Maryland (near Severna Park). She had their second child at age 16. The marriage quickly unraveled. A doctor suggested that she get a job to ease her pain and prevent a nervous breakdown. She was working in a dress shop in Glen Burnie, Maryland, when she met Barbara Mewshaw, a part-time model. Mewshaw introduced her to the Walters Modeling Agency and helped her enter the Miss Maryland USA pageant. Gage wanted to be in the pageant in the hopes of working as a model. Once entered in the contest she won.

She told the head of the modeling agency that she was married and could not go to the Miss USA pageant. She claimed one of the pageant officials told her to lie to the public. Pageant officials in Baltimore deny that they told her to lie.

Both women flew to Long Beach, California, for the Miss USA pageant.

Pageant scandal
In July 1957, aged 18, Gage represented state of Maryland at the Miss USA pageant, and was crowned as the winner, the first winner from that state.

Pageant officials launched an investigation after rumors began to surface about her background and past. After Gage lied to reporters or declined to comment when they questioned her, she confessed the truth a day later: she was actually 18, not 21, had been married twice, and was a mother of two young children, which her mother and mother-in-law confirmed to reporters. As being a wife and mother were clear violations of the contest rules, Gage was immediately disqualified and stripped of her Miss USA crown. The crown and prizes subsequently went to the first runner-up, Charlotte Sheffield, Miss Utah.

By the time the truth was revealed, it was too late for Sheffield to replace her in the Miss Universe pageant, as Gage had already competed in the Miss Universe preliminary competition and been announced as one of the Top 15 semifinalists. When Miss Universe officials were informed of the situation, Gage was ejected from the competition, and Mónica Lamas of Argentina, who had placed 16th, replaced Gage as a semifinalist.

The Miss Universe title ultimately was won by Peru's Gladys Zender, who also nearly lost her crown when she was revealed to be only 17 (under the minimum age requirement), but pageant officials allowed her to retain her title, as it was customary at the time in Peru for those that had lived past their sixth month during their birth year to unofficially use the higher age, meaning Zender was considered to be 18 (having lived more than six months as a 17-year-old).

Aftermath and later life
When news of Gage's marriage broke, she was showered with television appearances. Her subsequent appearance on The Ed Sullivan Show was one of CBS's highest rated shows at the time. She also received hate mail.

1957-1964
In 1957, aged 18, she moved to Las Vegas, Nevada with her two sons. She worked as a featured showgirl at the Hotel Tropicana. In early 1958, Gage divorced Ennis. She met dancer Nick Covacevich, who became her third husband. In 1960, Gage was charged with child abuse. In 1961, she filed for divorce from Covacevich and moved to Los Angeles, California, where she met her eventual fourth husband, an aspiring screenwriter, Gunther Peter Collatz.

In 1962, she appeared in the Roger Corman film Tales of Terror. In 1964, she had a tiny role in the film A House Is Not A Home and divorced Collatz. She experimented with LSD and was seen with John Drew Barrymore and Mickey Hargitay. She also appeared in the 1964 exploitation film Scream of the Butterfly directed by Eber Lobato, co-starring Nélida Lobato.

1965-1980
In November 1965 Gage was found unconscious in a motel room, overdosed on barbiturates. She was 26 years old. Her suicide attempt and drug possession led her to spend three weeks at Camarillo State Hospital.

In 1965 her first book was published, My Name Is Leona Gage, Will Somebody Please Help Me? Her picture appeared on the cover of the ghostwritten book. At the end of 1965 she starred in the film Scream of the Butterfly. The film flopped. After an unsuccessful movie career she enrolled in hairdressing school. In 1966 she began work singing and dancing in burlesque clubs, married for the fifth and sixth times, and had another son. She had a daughter and four sons.  She eventually lost custody of five of her children. Her daughter lived with her off and on.  A comeback attempt in commercials was unsuccessful. In the 1970s and 1980s she attempted work in mainstream acting roles.

Gage lived in Southern California from the 1960s until her death.  While in her 50s, she was diagnosed with chronic obstructive pulmonary disease.

References

External links

1939 births
2010 deaths
Beauty pageant controversies
Deaths from chronic obstructive pulmonary disease
Miss USA 1950s delegates
Miss USA winners
People from Glen Burnie, Maryland
People from Wichita Falls, Texas
Burials at Hillside Memorial Park Cemetery